Maximiliano Cavallotti (born 15 November 1984) is an Argentine professional footballer who plays as a goalkeeper for Central Córdoba.

Career
Cavallotti spent time in the youth academy of Newell's Old Boys up until 2007, prior to joining Argentine Primera División team Gimnasia y Esgrima in the same year. He made his professional debut for Gimnasia in the 2009–10 season and went on to play over one hundred times in ten years for the club. During his time with Gimnasia, Cavallotti scored two goals. The first came in March 2015 as he scored a 91st-minute consolation in a 2–3 defeat to Atlético Paraná, before converting a penalty three months later in a 3–2 win over Chacarita Juniors. In August 2017, Cavallotti left Gimnasia and joined Primera División side Argentinos Juniors.

He made his top-flight debut on 9 September against Patronato. Central Córdoba of Primera B Nacional signed Cavallotti in July 2018.

Career statistics
.

References

External links

1984 births
Living people
Sportspeople from Santa Fe Province
Argentine footballers
Association football goalkeepers
Primera Nacional players
Argentine Primera División players
Gimnasia y Esgrima de Jujuy footballers
Argentinos Juniors footballers
Central Córdoba de Santiago del Estero footballers